Eric Lombard (born 14 April 1965) is a Belgian sports shooter. He competed in the mixed skeet event at the 1984 Summer Olympics.

References

External links
 

1965 births
Living people
Belgian male sport shooters
Olympic shooters of Belgium
Shooters at the 1984 Summer Olympics
Sportspeople from Brussels